Yébleron is a commune in the Seine-Maritime department in the Normandy region in northern France.

Geography
The A29 autoroute forms part of the commune's southern border.

Population

Places of interest

 The church of St. Leger, dating from the thirteenth century.
 A seventeenth-century stone cross.
 A medieval enclosure.

See also
Communes of the Seine-Maritime department

References

Communes of Seine-Maritime